The discography of Feeder, a Cymro-Japanese rock band which formed in 1994, consists of eleven studio albums, twelve compilation albums, four extended plays (EP), and forty singles on The Echo Label, their own label Big Teeth Music, Cooking Vinyl and BMG as well as forty-nine music videos. Alongside charting twelve Top 75 albums domestically, they also have 25 Top 75 singles. In 2022 Feeder became one of the few artists in U.K. chart history, to achieve top 10 albums in at least four different decades (1990s, 2000s, 2010s and 2020s), and also one of a very few since 1960 to have at least five top five albums.

An original incarnation of the band was formed in 1992 under the name of "Reel" by the remaining members Grant Nicholas, Jon Lee and Simon Blight of electroacoustic group Raindancer, after the departure of their guitarist John Canham, although Simon Blight departed in 1992 to make way for Taka Hirose in 1994, after the band had used many session bassists from 1992 to 1994. Feeder's lineup after signing with The Echo Label in the same year of their formation consisted of Grant Nicholas (guitar/vocals) Jon Lee (drums) and Taka Hirose (bass), while demos sent out to radio and venues to gain gigs still featured session bassists. In January 2002, Jon Lee died by suicide at home in Miami. Former Skunk Anansie drummer Mark Richardson began to record and play with the band before being made an official member. In May 2009 he left Feeder to reform Skunk Anansie. Since Richardson's departure, Feeder have variously employed drummers Karl Brazil, Damon Wilson, Tim Trotter, and Geoff Holroyde for recording and touring work.

Feeder's music has been inspired by a wide variety of artists and styles, including The Police, Nirvana and Smashing Pumpkins. The band's sound was radically changed from that of Rain Dancer on their debut release the Two Colours EP (1995), but has since introduced more acoustic aspects to their music, including elements of pianos and string orchestras.

Feeder garnered media attention in 2001 for their third album, Echo Park and its lead single "Buck Rogers", which later become a UK Top five single. In 2002, the band released their fourth album Comfort in Sound, being their first since the loss of their drummer Jon Lee earlier in the year. The album touched on many themes of loss and coming to terms with death, although it also explored themes of positivity. Despite not being amongst their five top five albums, Comfort in Sound is Feeder's most successful studio album to date, selling over 507,277 copies in the United Kingdom between October 2002 and October 2017.

After the campaign for their 2006 singles compilation was complete, the band would later drop out of mainstream radio attention, while still charting seven more top 20 albums with the latest being 2022's Torpedo, making the top five and became the first time the band would have back to back top five studio albums.

Albums

Studio albums

Compilation albums

Notes

I  B-sides album released through the band's website, later released commercially in 2007.

Japanese import compilations

Extended plays

Singles

Notes

I  Later appeared on Polythene, the band's first full-length album.
II  Originally released as a non-album single, but then appeared on the re-issued Polythene after the single made the top 40.
III  A full-band version of the acoustic recording on Polythene.
IV  Released in Germany, Belgium and France only.
V  Charted only on the UK Airplay chart, as the physical single was only available on their 2003 Arena Tour.
VI  Download bundles only.
VII  Download and vinyl only.
VIII  Single track download only single.
IX  Gratis download track only from album pre-orders.
X  2017 Record Store Day vinyl only release.

As featured performers

Promotional singles 

Notes

VII  300 copies were pressed for student radio promotion. It was never intended to be a single, although later became a b-side on "Day in Day Out".
VIII  Was not originally intended to be a promotional-only single. It was planned to be released on 12 March 2012 with "No Light" as its b-side, before being cancelled although promotional copies were already sent to radio stations.

Other charting songs

Miscellaneous

Music videos

 The re-edit of "Piece by Piece", is a new version of "Suffocate", only with unused footage from the original shoot added and also sometimes replacing some original scenes.
 Unlike the band's other videos, the video for "Side By Side" is a compilation of video clips from various Japanese news media agencies of the destruction caused by the 2011 Tsunami, and as such, has no single director.
"Just a Day II", is a remake of the original video, to raise awareness of the front line workers during the COVID-19 pandemic. Two people from the original video make a second appearance.

References

External links
 Feeder's official website
 Feeder's MySpace profile

Discographies of British artists
Rock music group discographies